This is a list of International Emmy Award winners.

Current categories

Arts Programming

Best Performance by an Actor

Best Performance by an Actress

Comedy

Documentary

Drama series

Non-English Language U.S. Primetime Programs 
{| class="wikitable" style="font-size:1.00em; line-height:1.5em;"
! Year
! Non-English LanguageU.S. Primetime Programs 
! Country
! Network 
|-
| 2014
| El Señor de los Cielos
|rowspan="10"|
| Telemundo
|-
| 2015
| Arrepentidos: El Infierno de Montoya
| National Geographic/Fox Telecolombia	
|-
| 2016
| Francisco, El Jesuita
| Telemundo
|-
| 2017
| Sr. Ávila
| HBO Latin America/Lemon Films
|-
| 2018
| El Vato
| Universo/Endemol Shine 
|-
| 2019
| Falco
| Spiral International/Red Arrow/Dynamo
|-
| rowspan=2| 2020
| 2019 Latin Grammy Awards
| Univision/The Latin Recording Academy
|-
| La Reina del Sur
| Telemundo/Netflix
|-
| 2021
| 2020 Latin Grammy Awards
| Univision/The Latin Recording Academy
|-
| 2022
| Buscando a Frida
| Telemundo/Argos
|-
|}

 Non-Scripted Entertainment 

 Short-Form Series 

 Telenovela 

 TV Movie / Mini-Series 

 Other categories 

 Children & Young People 

 Kids: Animation 

 Kids: Factual & Entertainment  

 Kids: Live-Action 

 Journalism 
 News 

 Current Affairs 

 Honorary Awards 

 Founders Awards 

 Directorate Award 

 Others 

 International Children's Day of Broadcasting Award 
Presented by UNICEF in conjunction with International Emmy Awards and awarded to a broadcaster whose children's programming on or around the first Sunday in March of the previous year best reflects the theme declared by UNICEF for that year.
2010 – Télévision Togolaise of Togo for its weekly A Nous La Planete2009 – Citizen TV of Kenya for its weekly Angels Café2008 – China Central Television children's channel for documentary On the Way2007 – National Broadcasting of Thailand for From South to North, From East to West, Thailand ICDB – Unite for Children, Unite Against AIDS2006 – Teleradio Moldova for their program Let's Play!2005 – Egyptian TV for Rebellion of the Canes2004 – ATN Bangla for Amrao pari (We, too, Can)
2003 – Television 13 of Colombia, with the support of Fundación Imaginario for Tropas de Paz (Peace Troops), Disparando Cámaras para la Paz (Cameras Shooting for Peace) and A Prender TV'' (To Learn TV) Directed by Mariana Ferrer and Alejandro Jaramillo
2002 – Star News of New Delhi, India
2001 – Consorcio Cigala by Canal Capital of Colombia. Directed by Diego León Hoyos Jaramillo. Assistant Director Mariana Ferrer and Alejandro Jaramillo
2001 – ACE Communications of Kenya for contributions to the UNICEF Say Yes for Children Campaign in 2001
2000 – TV Cultura of Brazil
1999 – TV Cultura of Brazil
1998 – TV Cultura of Brazil
1997 – Namibian Broadcasting Corporation
1996 – TVOntario, Canada
1995 – Sabado Chiquito De Corporan of the Dominican Republic

Categories extinct

Dramaturgy

Best European Artist

Arts documentary

Drama series

Performing Arts

Popular Arts

Children & Young People

Kids: Series

Kids: Preschool

Kids: Digital

Kids: TV Movie / Mini-Series

Kids: Non-Scripted Entertainment

Kids: Factual

Interactivity

Best Interactive Channel

Best Interactive Program

Best Interactive TV service

Digital

Digital Program: Children & Young People

Digital Program: Fiction

Digital Program: Non-Fiction

Notes

References

External links
 International Emmy Awards

International Emmy Awards ceremonies